Stuart Skelton (born 1968 in Sydney) is an Australian operatic heldentenor. In 2016 he opened the Metropolitan Opera season with Nina Stemme in Wagner's Tristan und Isolde.

Discography

Studio concert recordings
2008: Mahler – Das Lied von der Erde, with conductor Michael Tilson Thomas and the San Francisco Symphony
2010: Mahler – Das Lied von der Erde, with conductor Vladimir Ashkenazy and the Sydney Symphony Orchestra
2011: Lancino – Requiem, with conductor Eliahu Inbal and the Orchestre philharmonique de Radio France, Naxos
2020: Peter Grimes, with conductor Edward Gardner and the Bergen Philharmonic Orchestra, Chandos

Live opera recordings
2009: Siegmund in Wagner's Die Walküre, with conductor Simone Young in Hamburg, Oehms Classics

Awards
Skelton won the Best Male Performer in a Supporting Role in an Opera at the 5th Helpmann Awards in 2005 for his Siegmund in Wagner's Ring Cycle at the State Opera of South Australia, and the Helpmann Award for Best Male Performer in an Opera in 2010 for his title role in Peter Grimes for Opera Australia.

International Opera Awards
The International Opera Awards is an annual awards ceremony honouring excellence in opera around the world. 

|-
| 2014
| himself 
| Male Singer of the Year
| 
|-

AIR Awards
The Australian Independent Record Awards (commonly known informally as AIR Awards) is an annual awards night to recognise, promote and celebrate the success of Australia's Independent Music sector.

|-
| AIR Awards of 2020
|Asher Fisch – Tristan und Isolde
| Best Independent Classical Album
| 
|-

References

External links 
 
 Stuart Skelton, Heldentenor – Opera~Opera article 2006

Living people
1968 births
Australian operatic tenors
Heldentenors
Helpmann Award winners
21st-century Australian male opera singers